Tecnia Institute of Advanced Studies (TIAS) is a private college affiliated with Guru Gobind Singh Indraprastha University and located in Madhuban Chowk Rohini , Delhi. TIAS is recognised under section 2(f) by UGC. Admission to TIAS is through the Common Entrance Test (CET) conducted by Guru Gobind Singh Indraprastha University.
Tecnia Institute of Advanced Studies (TIAS) – is ISO 9001:2015 & ISO 14001:2015 certified institute for its Quality Management System (QMS) and Environmental Management System (EMS) by ISC Assurance Services Pvt. Ltd for recognition for its well established system

History
TIAS was established in 1998 by Health and Education Society.

Recognition and accreditation
TIAS has been accredited by the National Assessment and Accreditation Council (NAAC) with an "A" grade. The institute offers MBA, MCA, BBA and BJMC degree programmes.

Courses

Admissions
Admissions in TIAS are provided through a Common Entrance Test (CET) exam conducted by GGSIPU.
Admissions are also provided through management quota for with 10% of the seats are reserved by the college. Charges for seat might defer from course to course but might cost approx 4-10 lacs per seat.

References

Universities and colleges in Delhi
Colleges of the Guru Gobind Singh Indraprastha University
Journalism schools in India
Business schools in Delhi